In enzymology, a N-acylhexosamine oxidase is an enzyme that catalyzes the chemical reaction

N-acetyl-D-glucosamine + O2  N-acetyl-D-glucosaminate + H2O2

Thus, the two substrates of this enzyme are N-acetyl-D-glucosamine and O2, whereas its two products are N-acetyl-D-glucosaminate and H2O2.

This enzyme belongs to the family of oxidoreductases, specifically those acting on the CH-OH group of donor with oxygen as acceptor.  The systematic name of this enzyme class is N-acyl-D-hexosamine:oxygen 1-oxidoreductase. Other names in common use include N-acyl-D-hexosamine oxidase, and N-acyl-beta-D-hexosamine:oxygen 1-oxidoreductase.

References

 
 

EC 1.1.3
Enzymes of unknown structure